The Armenian Catholic Eparchy of Kharput was a modern eparchy (Eastern Catholic diocese) and remains a titular see of the Armenian Catholic Church (sui iuris (Armenian Rite in Armenian language).

History 
It was created on 1 May 1850, on territory in Turkey previously without proper Ordinary of the particular church.

Its seat was in the Turkish town of Elazığ and was suppressed in 1972.

Episcopal Ordinaries 
(all Armenian Rite)

Suffragan Eparchs (Bishops) of Kharput 
 Avedis Arpiarian (1890.09.23 – 1898.04.05), later Titular Archbishop of Anazarbus of the Armenians (1898.04.05 – 1911.08.27), Eparch (Bishop) of Marasc of the Armenians (1911.08.27 – 1928.06.29), Auxiliary Bishop of the Patriarchate Cilicia of the Armenians (Lebanon) (1928.06.29 – 1931.10.17), Patriarch of Cilicia of the Armenians (Lebanon) ([1931.10.17] 1933.03.13 – 1937.10.26)
 Stefano Israelian (1899.02.06 – death 1915)

Titular see 
It is now a titular see, from the date of suppression.
 
It remains vacant, without a single incumbent.

References

Source and External links 
 GCatholic, with incumbent biography links

Eastern Catholic titular sees
Former Armenian Catholic eparchies